Victor Demanet (3 February 1895 – 7 February 1964) was a Belgian sculptor. His work was part of the art competitions at the 1924 Summer Olympics, the 1932 Summer Olympics, and the 1936 Summer Olympics.

References

1895 births
1964 deaths
19th-century Belgian sculptors
19th-century Belgian male artists
20th-century Belgian sculptors
Belgian sculptors
Olympic competitors in art competitions
People from Givet
20th-century Belgian male artists